Jimmy Gray (born November, 1929 in Dublin, Ireland) is an Irish former sportsman. He played hurling and Gaelic football with the C. J. Kickhams GAA club until 1955 when he became a founding member of his local club Na Fianna. He was also a member of the Dublin senior inter-county teams in both codes throughout the 1950s and 1960s. He was the goalkeeper on the Dublin senior hurling team that lost to Tipperary in the 1961 All-Ireland Senior Hurling Championship. This was Dublin's last appearance in an All-Ireland Senior Hurling Final.

Gray subsequently served as a referee and as a GAA administrator. He held the position of chairman of the Dublin County Board from 1970 to 1981. As chairman of the Dublin County Board, he was instrumental in the appointment of Kevin Heffernan as manager of the Dublin senior football team in 1973. Gray also served as chairman of the Leinster Council of the GAA from 1990 to 1993. He took charge of the Dublin senior hurling team from 1993 until 1996.

He was declared the Hall of Fame Winner at The Friends of Dublin Hurling Awards Night on Friday 13 November 2009.

On 7 July 2013, he was accorded the honour of presenting the Bob O'Keefe Cup to John McCaffrey, captain of the Dublin senior hurling team that won the Leinster Senior Hurling Championship for the first time since 1961, when Gray was the goalkeeper on the winning Dublin team.

He currently holds the honorary position of President of Dublin GAA.

References

 

1929 births
Living people
Dual players
Dublin County Board administrators
Dublin inter-county Gaelic footballers
Dublin inter-county hurlers
Hurling managers
Hurling goalkeepers
Hurling referees
Leinster Provincial Council administrators
Na Fianna Gaelic footballers
Na Fianna hurlers